Feature.fm is a marketing and advertising platform for music industry professionals like labels, artists, and other music marketers. They offer a self-serve, music focused ad platform and a marketing suite to help artists marketing to fans in a smarter way. The Marketing Suite includes tools like Pre-Saves, Gated Unlocks & Contests, Music Smart Link Landing Pages, Audience Email Collection, Music Analytics, and other landing pages that fans engage with or are directed to the artist's content.  The ad platform includes a native song advertising network through which artists can promote their songs inside music streaming services and on music websites. Artists' sponsored songs are played to people who are currently listening to streaming radio of the artist's style of music as an alternative to traditional audio ads. Feature.fm partners with streaming services to help them reduce audio ads and improve user experience by using native content as a source of advertising.

Feature.fm is currently funded by Star Farm Ventures.

Sponsored Song Partners 

Feature.fm is currently partnered with 8tracks, Deezer, Audiomack, Sua Musica, and a network of music websites and blogs.

Founders 
Feature.fm was founded by Lior Aharoni, Zohar Aharoni and Lior Shapsa.

References

External links

2013 establishments in Israel
Marketing companies established in 2013
Digital marketing companies of the United States